River Pig Saloon is a pair of bars in the U.S. state of Oregon, in Bend and Portland. Ramzy Hattar is the owner.

Description and history
Employees at both locations were laid off during the COVID-19 pandemic.

Portland
The Portland bar, located in the Pearl District, opened in 2014. Thrillist describes the Portland location as "your neighborhood bar that brings some grit back to the Pearl District". In 2020, the city allowed the bar to use part of the street for socially distanced service during the pandemic.

Bend
The Bend location opened May 2018. It closed temporarily during the COVID-19 pandemic. The bar was fined by the Oregon Liquor Control Commission in 2021.

References

External links 

 
 River Pig Saloon at Zomato

2014 establishments in Oregon
Restaurants in Bend, Oregon
Drinking establishments in Oregon
Pearl District, Portland, Oregon
Restaurants established in 2014
Restaurants in Portland, Oregon